Pedro Pireza (30 September 1911 in Barreiro, Portugal – sometime in 1989) was a  Portuguese footballer who played forward for Barreirense and Sporting. Pireza, had 2 caps for the Portugal national team.

External links

Portugal international footballers
Portuguese footballers
Primeira Liga players
Sporting CP footballers
1911 births
1989 deaths
Association football forwards
Sportspeople from Barreiro, Portugal